Andy Lin is an American esports player of Big Buck Hunter and professional photographer based in New York City.

The Self-Portrait Project 
 
In 2009, Lin founded The Self-Portrait Project (SPP), a photo-based, interactive archive project. Most notably, Lin has taken SPP to Haiti to promote advocacy and awareness of the nation's ongoing housing crisis. According to Lin, the self-portrait mechanism in SPP is influenced by the belief that decisions are best made by the people directly affected by them.

Photography 
Andy Lin is a social change photographer. In 2007 Lin co-founded Other Worlds, a non-profit that disseminated images and information about alternative economies and social movements around the world, with Gustavo Castro Soto and Beverly Bell. He also served as a photo editor for the street art quarterly founded by IO Wright, Overspray Magazine. As a travel photographer, he published photos in National Geographic Traveler, including a prize-winner in 2005. In 2006, he documented the Zapatista movement in Chiapas, Mexico for Punk Planet, titled "Zapatista Dreams."

Big Buck Hunter 
Nicknamed “The Big Buck Ninja,” Andy Lin is a veteran player of the competitive arcade game Big Buck Hunter. His nickname derives from his calm game-play and longevity in the sport. Lin is the only player to have competed at every World Championship since the inaugural tournament in 2008, except for in 2011, due to a Hurricane Irene related mishap. In 2010, he beat high profile Buck Hunter Travis Pastrana and placed a career-high 5th in both Big Buck Hunter Pro and Big Buck Safari. He placed 21st at the 2019 World Championship in Las Vegas, where he also debuted a custom installation of his Self-Portrait Project, fashioned out of an old Big Buck game unit.

References 

Living people
21st-century American photographers
American philanthropists
Year of birth missing (living people)